Anne Janelle is a classically trained Canadian musician who has focused on the cello.

Education 
Janelle earned a Bachelor of Music degree from the University of British Columbia studying classical music and the cello. Janelle has also earned a master's degree in cello performance from the University of Ottawa.

Performances 

Janelle has performed with pop artists such as Kanye West, Bruce Cockburn, and Holly Cole. She has also flourished in contemporary music, experimenting deeply with free improvisation in both music and dance.  Her cello is often heard backing up other artists, as on the William Hawkins tribute album Dancing Alone: Songs of William Hawkins.

Since 2006 Janelle has been collaborating and touring with James Hill.   Hill and Janelle, then known as Anne Davison, collaborated on True Love Don't Weep.  The CD was the winner of the 2009 Canadian Folk Music Awards Traditional Album of the Year. She appears with Hill in Mighty Uke: The Amazing Comeback of a Musical Underdog, a 2010 documentary on the ukulele.

Janelle plays a wide variety of songs, everything from folk, jazz, bluegrass and avant-garde.  She pushes the boundaries of cello music by combining it with her voice and the music of James Hill.

Concerts of note 

Cairns Ukulele Festival July 3, 2010
Concerts on Markland April 28, 2012

Personal life 

Currently Janelle lives in Brookfield, Nova Scotia with her husband and touring partner James Hill.  They met at the University of British Columbia and were married on September 21, 2013. They have one child.

Discography

Primary artist
 True Love Don't Weep (collaboration with James Hill) – Linus Entertainment – August 11, 2009
 Beauty Remains – April 21, 2012
 So Long at the Fair – Anne Janelle Records – January 20, 2014
 I Didn't Want to Break It – Anne Janelle Records – November 1, 2016

Contributing artist
 Dancing Alone – Songs of William Hawkins – True North Records – September 29, 2008
 Walking the Bones – Ian Tamblyn – 2011
 Skyline – Shawna Caspi – 2012

References

External links 
 Anne Jannelle website

Year of birth missing (living people)
Living people
Canadian cellists
University of British Columbia alumni
University of Ottawa alumni
Women cellists
Canadian Folk Music Award winners